Hugo-Maksimilian "Mart" Kuusik (9 December 1877 – 24 August 1965) was an Estonian rower who competed for the Russian Empire in the 1912 Summer Olympics.

Representing Russia, he won a bronze medal in a single sculls event.

His home-based rowing club was the "Pernauer Ruder Club" located in Pärnu.

References

External links
profile

1877 births
1965 deaths
People from Harju County
People from the Governorate of Estonia
Estonian male rowers
Olympic competitors for the Russian Empire
Rowers at the 1912 Summer Olympics
Olympic medalists in rowing
Medalists at the 1912 Summer Olympics